William Rankin (20 March 1900 – 1968) was a Scottish footballer who played as a centre half for Dundee, Blackburn Rovers and Charlton Athletic.

With Dundee he took part in two tours of Spain, finished on the losing side in the 1925 Scottish Cup Final and was selected for the Scottish Football League XI in 1926. In his first season after moving to England with Football League First Division Blackburn, he won the FA Cup in 1928. He moved on to Second Division Charlton in March 1932, but was part of the team relegated in 1932–33, after which he retired from the professional game and became as player-manager of Burton Town, signing several other Scots including Alex Hair, John Torbet and former Dundee and Charlton teammate Johnnie Rankin (no relation). He was possibly in post until 1939 when George Collin is known to have taken over.

References

Scottish footballers
Footballers from Glasgow
People from Bridgeton, Glasgow
Footballers from West Dunbartonshire
1900 births
1968 deaths
Date of death missing
Scottish football managers
Association football player-managers
Association football central defenders
Scottish Football League players
Scottish Junior Football Association players
Scottish Football League representative players
English Football League players
FA Cup Final players
Burton Town F.C. managers
Burton Town F.C. players
Dundee F.C. players
Blackburn Rovers F.C. players
Charlton Athletic F.C. players
Parkhead F.C. players